The International Kim Jong-il Prize is a North Korean award named after the country's second leader, Kim Jong-il. It was created on December 24, 2012, approximately a year after his death.

Contents

The International Kim Jong-il Prize consists of diploma, medal and trophy (metallic handicraft work.)

Rules of conferment
 The Prize is conferred upon distinguished figures in political, social and academic circles and those who have made special contributions to the independence of the country and nation and to the global independence and peace and cultural development of humanity.
 The Prize is conferred according to the decision of the International Kim Jong-il Prize Council.

Recipients
In 2013, the council awarded the prize to Obiang Nguema Mbasogo, president of Equatorial Guinea "for his commitment to justice, development, peace and harmony." President Obiang received his award in person in Pyongyang on August 7, 2013.
Kenichi Ogami, secretary general of the International Institute of the Juche Idea (2017) for "actively conduct[ing] the study and dissemination of the Juche idea for decades while fully supporting the Korean people's struggle for national reunification and international justice".

The International Kim Jong-il Prize Council
The council selects and decides the candidate and organizes the conferment of the Prize. The council was officially registered in India. Its headquarters is in New Delhi, India. The Council consists of 1 secretary-general and 7 directors.

See also

Orders and medals of North Korea
Order of Kim Jong-il
International Kim Il-sung Prize

References

Orders, decorations, and medals of North Korea
Kim Jong-il
2012 establishments in North Korea